The Triumph of Tehran refers to the entrance of the pro-constitutionalists in Tehran on 13 July 1909, which led Mohammad Ali Shah Qajar to seek refuge at the Russian legation in Tehran, before he was sent in exile. The event ended the period in Iranian history known as the minor tyranny.

Background
In 1908, revolutionaries gathered in Azerbaijan, Isfahan (led by Ali-Qoli Khan Bakhtiari and his elder brother Najaf-Qoli Khan Bakhtiari), and Gilan, aiming to depose Mohammad Ali Shah Qajar. They killed Mohammed Ali Sardar Afkham (Aqa Balakhan) (fa), Rasht's governor.

Events
After a five-day battle, the revolutionaries took the capital's control. At the same time, their leaders gathered in the Baharestan palace and decided to replace Mohammad Ali Shah Qajar with Ahmad Shah Qajar.

All these changes took place under the name of Superior parliament which involved 30 people.

See also
 Persian Constitutional Revolution

References

History of Tehran
1909 in Iran
Persian Constitutional Revolution
Iranian civil wars